Corona del Mar (Spanish for "Crown of the Sea") is a seaside neighborhood in the city of Newport Beach, California. It generally consists of all the land on the seaward face of the San Joaquin Hills south of Avocado Avenue to the city limits, as well as the development of Irvine Terrace, just north of Avocado. Corona del Mar is known for its beaches, tide pools, cliffside views and village shops. Beaches in the area include Corona del Mar State Beach as well as Crystal Cove State Park south of Corona del Mar, accessible by paths winding down a steep hillside. Corona del Mar has a representative to the Newport Beach City Council. Residents use a mailing address of Corona del Mar with the 92625 ZIP code.

History
The Tongva village or landmark site of Moyongna was located at or near Corona del Mar. Some researchers have placed the location at the Newporter Inn, while others have disputed this location. 

The region of Corona Del Mar was initially purchased for $150,000 by James Irvine in 1875. Almost 30 years later in 1904, the 700 acres of land was sold to Corona Del Mar's founder, George E. Hart. The community of Corona Del Mar grew to establish its own post office on July 16, 1926, with Mrs. Edna L. Stuckey assuming duties as the first postmistress. A development consisting of unsold land in Corona del Mar was established in 1915 and named Balboa Palisades. 

The older area of Corona del Mar known as the Flower Streets consists mostly of closely spaced, free-standing, detached single-family houses of varying architecture, concentrated along Pacific Coast Highway (also known as "PCH" or State Route 1). Newer developments in Harbor View Hills consist of California ranch-style houses, many with expansive ocean views. Irvine Terrace is another neighborhood in Corona Del Mar located slightly north of Avocado, including a mix of newly developed homes as well as original mid-1950 homes many with incredible views of Balboa Island and Newport harbor.

Demographics

As of the census of 2000, for Corona del Mar (which consists entirely of the 92625 ZIP code) there were 13,407 people, 6,885 households, and 3,957 families residing in the city. The population density was 1,997.8/km2. The racial makeup of the city was 88.9% White, 0.3% African American, 0.2% Native American, 5.1% Asian, 0.3% Pacific Islander, 0.7% from other races, and 1.1% from two or more races. Hispanic or Latino of any race were 5.9% of the population.

There were 6,885 households, out of which 17.9% had children under the age of 18 living with them, 47.9% were married couples living together, 5.1% had a female householder with no husband present, and 45.3% were non-families. 34.6% of all households were made up of individuals, and 11.8% had someone living alone who was 65 years of age or older. The average household size was 2.05 and the average family size was 2.63.

In the city the population was spread out, with 15.6% under the age of 18, 3.2% from 18 to 24, 31.4% from 25 to 44, 23.7% from 45 to 64, and 20.1% who were 65 years of age or older. The median age was 35 years. For every 100 females, there were 94.8 males. For every 100 females age 18 and over, there were 94.7 males.

The median income for a household in the city was $120,080, and the median income for a family was $150,323. Males had a median income of $99,000 versus $52,355 for females. The per capita income for the city was $96,704. About 5.0% of families and 3.8% of the population were below the poverty line, including 3.6% of those under age 18 and 5.0% of those age 65 or over.

Corona del Mar High School is located in the neighborhood of Eastbluff.

Points of interest
There is a wide variety of landmarks and points of interest to visit in Corona Del Mar. Big Corona Beach is the larger of the two Corona Del Mar state beaches, stretching half a mile long. The botanical gardens at Sherman Library and Gardens is a popular landmark in Corona Del Mar, displaying a wide range of flowers, vegetation, and a green house. 
 Sherman Library and Gardens
 Fashion Island
 Crystal Cove State Park
 The Goldenrod Footbridge
 Corona Del Mar State Beach
 China Cove

In popular culture 
The Oscar winning film, All Quiet on the Western Front was filmed in the very beginning of Corona Del Mar's days. 

It is the setting for the Fox series Arrested Development (mentioned by name in Season 2, Episode 14, "The Immaculate Election") as well as residence of Martine and Dustin Rhodes in the Dean Koontz novel False Memory.

The Lost Dogs paid tribute to Corona del Mar on their 2006 album, The Lost Cabin and the Mystery Trees, with the song "Only One Bum In Corona del Mar."

Main Beach in Corona del Mar served as the backdrop for part of the 2017 "Would You Ever" music video featuring Skrillex and Poo Bear.

The O.C. used places, such as Corona del Mar High School, in Corona del Mar as a reference point for the show.

Parking Policies 
There is no municipal government conducted in Corona Del Mar which makes it a district of Newport Beach. The parking policies in Corona Del Mar fall under Newport Beach parking policies and range from street parking to paid parking at state beach areas. Public parking is available in many areas, however in residential areas such as the flower streets, the city of Newport Beach have experienced parking deficits in high demand seasons. The implementing of pay meters has helped enforce time restrictions in high traffic, nonresidential areas of Corona Del Mar. Beach park areas have a designated time between hours of 6am and 10pm 7 days a week when visitors are allowed to park and pay hourly. Paid beach parking in Corona Del Mar is a state policy that is geared toward helping decrease overcrowding of residential parking areas.

References

External links
https://www.cdmchamber.com/

https://www.orangecounty.net/cities/CoronaDelMar.html

https://www.newportbeachca.gov/home

https://www.parks.ca.gov/?page_id=652

Populated coastal places in California
Neighborhoods in Newport Beach, California